Haplophthalmus rhinoceros is a species of woodlouse in the family Trichoniscidae. It is found in Europe and Northern Asia (excluding China).

The IUCN conservation status of Haplophthalmus rhinoceros is "VU", vulnerable. The species faces a high risk of endangerment in the medium term. The IUCN status was reviewed in 1996.

References

Isopoda
Articles created by Qbugbot
Crustaceans described in 1930